Loku Hettige Danushka Dilhara (born 3 July 1980), known as Dilhara Lokuhettige, is a Sri Lankan former cricketer, who played limited over cricket. He is a right-handed batsman and a right-arm medium-fast bowler. Lokuhittege had captained Colombo's Asoka Vidalaya from Under-13s to senior level. In January 2021, he was found guilty of three offences under the ICC Anti-Corruption Code. As a result, he was banned from all cricket for eight years.

Fixing allegations 

Dilhara Lokuhettige was suspected by Al Jazeera along with Jeevantha Kulatunga for being involved in match fixing during a fake T20 series in the United Arab Emirates.

The Al Jazeera's Investigation Unit also revealed that former Pakistani cricketer Hasan Raza, Jeevantha Kulatunga and Dilhara Lokuhettige were preparing to make money by organising and arranging a fake tournament in the UAE solely to make huge collection of money to fix matches in the future.

International career
When he was first picked for the Indian Oil Cup in 2005, there was relative shock, as Lokuhettige was picked practically out of obscurity after moderate domestic performances. However, he proved a quality acquisition, capturing both good batting and bowling statistics.

Domestic career
His big break came when he joined Bloomfield and met Ruchira Palliyaguru in 1999, who recommended him to the cricketing academy. He has Twenty-20 cricket since 2004 and was picked for the national team for the first time in July 2005. He made his Twenty20 debut on 17 August 2004, for Moors Sports Club in the 2004 SLC Twenty20 Tournament.

Retirement
Lokuhettige announced his retirement from Tests and ODIs on 24 September 2016. He criticized captain Angelo Mathews by stating that he cannot enter to the squad until Mathews playing for the team.

References

External links
 

1980 births
Living people
Lokuhittege, Dilhara
Sri Lanka One Day International cricketers
Sri Lanka Twenty20 International cricketers
Moors Sports Club cricketers
Uva cricketers
Ruhuna cricketers
Sri Lanka Cricket Combined XI cricketers
Kandurata cricketers
Kandurata Warriors cricketers
Asian Games medalists in cricket
Cricketers at the 2010 Asian Games
Cricketers at the 2014 Asian Games
Medalists at the 2014 Asian Games
Galle Guardians cricketers
Asian Games gold medalists for Sri Lanka
Chattogram Challengers cricketers
Cricketers banned for corruption